Margaret Desenfans (1737-1814) or (1731-1814) was one of three founders of Dulwich Picture Gallery.

She was born in Clasemont, Swansea, County Glamorgan, the daughter of Robert Morris (d.1768) and Margaret Morris (née Jenkins).  Robert was a Shropshire entrepreneur who had come to Swansea in 1724 to supervise the Llangyfelach Copper Works, founded in 1717, and had taken control of the works when the owner, John Lane, was declared bankrupt in 1726. Her siblings included: Robert (a barrister born  1743, a supporter of the radical politician, John Wilkes, who died unmarried c. 1797), Bridget, Jane and Sir John Morris, 1st Baronet. John followed their father as an industrialist, active in copper-smelting and coal-mining in Swansea, South Wales. Morriston, in the Tawe valley, is named after her family. See also the Morris baronets.

In 1757, aged 20, she was painted by Sir Joshua Reynolds. A copy of this Portrait of Margaret Desenfans was commissioned by Dulwich College in 1930 and executed by Moussa Ayoub.

In 1776, she married the art collector and dealer Noel Desenfans. She, her French husband, and their friend Francis Bourgeois would eventually build up an art collection which became the basis of Dulwich Picture Gallery in London.

References

1737 births
1814 deaths
People from Swansea
Dulwich Picture Gallery
British art collectors
Museum founders